Kennard Neil Bates (30 May 1928 – 14 July 2003) was a New Zealand middle-distance athlete who represented his country at the 1950 British Empire Games.

Hailing from Stratford and representing West Coast North Island, Bates won the New Zealand junior 1 mile title in 1947, recording a time of 4:22.8. In 1949, he progressed to the senior ranks and won the men's 1 mile title at the New Zealand athletics championships, in a time of 4:18.2. The following year, he represented New Zealand at the 1950 British Empire Games in Auckland in the men's 1 mile, where he ran a time of 4:25.8 to finish sixth in his heat and did not progress to the final.

Bates died on 14 July 2003, and his ashes were buried at Hillcrest Cemetery, Whakatāne.

References

1928 births
2003 deaths
People from Stratford, New Zealand
New Zealand male middle-distance runners
Athletes (track and field) at the 1950 British Empire Games
Commonwealth Games competitors for New Zealand